Fogle is a surname. Notable people with the surname include:

Ben Fogle (born 1973), English television presenter and writer
Bruce Fogle (born 1944), veterinarian and author
James Fogle (born 1936), American author
Jared Fogle (born 1977), child prostitution client and child pornography possessor, Subway spokesman
Julius Fogle (born 1971), American boxer
Larry Fogle (born 1953), American basketball player

See also
Fogel
Fogle Peak
Goldfogle